Kim Seong-mun (born 15 October 1962) is a South Korean fencer. He competed in the individual and team épée events at the 1984 Summer Olympics.

References

External links
 

1962 births
Living people
South Korean male épée fencers
Olympic fencers of South Korea
Fencers at the 1984 Summer Olympics
South Korean épée fencers